Kenny Burks (born October 30, 1959) is a former American stock car racing driver. Burks competed in 93 NASCAR Busch Series races between 1984 and 1989. Burks achieved a total of 10 top ten finishes throughout his career. His best finish in the points standings was a 14th in 1986.

References

External links
 

Living people
1959 births
NASCAR drivers
Racing drivers from Virginia
People from Virginia
People from Charlottesville, Virginia